Zach Carroll (born March 16, 1994) is an American soccer player who plays as a defender for Las Vegas Lights in the USL Championship.

Career

Early career
Carroll attended Grand Blanc High School where he was a member of the varsity soccer team, as well as the placekicker for the football team. In 2011, Carroll was a member of the United States U-17 National Team, starting at center back for both the U-17 World Cup in Mexico, as well as the CONCACAF Tournament in Jamaica, where he won Gold. In 2011, Carroll was named NSCAA National Boys High School Player of the Year, an NSCAA All-American, Michigan's Mr. Soccer, and Michigan's Gatorade Player of the Year. At the collegiate level, Carroll played soccer with the University of Virginia for his freshman and sophomore season before transferring to Michigan State University for his junior and senior seasons.

Professional

On January 14, 2016 Carroll was selected by the New York Red Bulls in the 2016 MLS SuperDraft as the 38th pick. After a successful preseason, Carroll signed his first professional contract days before the 2016 season on March 3. Carroll made his first MLS bench appearance on March 12 as an unused sub in a 3–0 defeat to the Montreal Impact.

On March 26, the New York Red Bulls announced that they had loaned Carroll and six other first team players to New York Red Bulls II for their home opener. He went on to make his professional debut for New York Red Bulls II on March 26, appearing as a starter in a 2–2 draw against Toronto FC II.

Carroll was waived by the club on May 5, following the signing of defender, Aurélien Collin. On May 20, he rejoined the organization signing with New York Red Bulls II. On October 18, 2016 Carroll was named to the 2016 USL All-League Second Team, as he helped the club to the USL regular season title. On October 23, 2016 Carroll helped the club to a 5–1 victory over Swope Park Rangers in the 2016 USL Cup Final.

Carroll was released by Red Bulls II in November 2016.

On December 1, 2016, Carroll was signed by Orlando City B of USL for the 2017 season.

Carroll signed with Reno 1868 FC for the 2018 season on December 19, 2017.

Carroll was announced as a new signing for USL Championship side Las Vegas Lights on January 25, 2023.

Career statistics

Honors

Club
New York Red Bulls II
USL Cup (1): 2016

References

External links 

1994 births
Living people
American soccer players
Association football defenders
Flint City Bucks players
Michigan State Spartans men's soccer players
National Premier Soccer League players
New York Red Bulls draft picks
New York Red Bulls players
New York Red Bulls II players
Orlando City B players
People from Grand Blanc, Michigan
Reno 1868 FC players
RVA FC players
Soccer players from Michigan
USL League Two players
Virginia Cavaliers men's soccer players
Memphis 901 FC players
Las Vegas Lights FC players